The Drum Tower of Xi'an, located in the heart of Xi'an, the capital of Shaanxi province, Northwestern China, along with the Bell Tower  is a symbol of the city. Erected in 1380 during the early Ming Dynasty (Hongwu era), it stands towering above the city center and offers incredible view of Xi'an.

The Drum Tower got its name from the huge drum located within the building. In contrast to the Bell Tower, where the bell was stricken at dawn, the drum was beaten at sunset to indicate the end of the day.

On the Drum Tower's first floor, lies a hall in which hang many large drums. Each is decorated with intrinsic and beautiful Chinese writing, which symbolises good fortune. The impressive arrays of drums are only on show and visitors are not allowed to touch any of them. But there is an extra drum near the front entrance where visitors can pose for pictures for a small fee.

Inside the Drum Tower there is also a drum museum, where a variety of drums are on display, some of which can be dated back thousands of years. There is a drum show performed here every day. The top of the tower commands a panoramic view of the city.

Gallery

See also
 Giant Wild Goose Pagoda, another main symbol of Xi'an
 Drum Tower of Nanjing, a tower also built in Hongwu era

Buildings and structures completed in 1380
Towers completed in the 14th century
Towers in China
Drum towers
Museums in Xi'an
Musical instrument museums
Ming dynasty architecture
Major National Historical and Cultural Sites in Shaanxi
Tourist attractions in Xi'an
Buildings and structures in Xi'an
Music organizations based in China